Tillandsia walter-richteri is a species in the genus Tillandsia. This species is endemic to Bolivia.

References

walter-richteri
Flora of Bolivia